Yed District also known as Yeed District is a district of the southwestern Bakool region of Somalia. Its capital is Yed.

References
Districts of Somalia

Districts of Somalia
Bakool